"Heaven Sent" is the fourth solo single by Scottish musician Paul Haig. It was released in the UK on Island Records and licensed through Les Disques du Crépuscule in 1983. It reached a peak of position of number 73 on the UK Singles Chart.

This was Haig's first release with a major record label.  The track, along with its parent studio album, Rhythm of Life (1983), was recorded in New York with producer Alex Sadkin. A wide range of guest musicians appeared on the album; Tom Bailey of Thompson Twins, Bernie Worrell of Funkadelic and Anton Fier of the Feelies.

In mainland Europe, the single and album were released on Les Disques du Crépuscule.

Track listing
"Heaven Sent"
"Running Away"/"Back Home"

References

External links
 

1983 singles
Paul Haig songs
1982 songs
Songs written by Paul Haig
Island Records singles
Song recordings produced by Alex Sadkin